"Louder" is the debut single by British girl group Parade, which was released on 13 March 2011. It debuted at number ten on the UK Singles Chart, and also peaked at number 41 in Ireland. The music video was filmed in an old house, with a girly house party, which went on in to the street with fireworks, it was directed by Emli Nava. The song was used in a Rimmel make up advert.

Critical reception
The song received mixed to positive reviews from the music critics. Lewis Corner of Digital Spy said about Louder: 'A winning mix of insistent beats, pinches of piano and choppy synths, all topped off with a nursery rhyme-style chant of "Turn it up boy, boy, turn it up boy…", 'Louder' bubbles with modern pop fun, but does it offer anything we haven't heard before? Put it this way - The Saturdays needn't worry about eBaying off their Mulberry handbags just yet.' He awarded the song three stars.

Music video
The music video shows the members of Parade having fun at a girly house party, and in the end they take the party to the streets where they are accompanied by some fireworks. The video was directed by Emil Nava.

Live performances

While Parade are touring, Louder was part of a set list of songs including a cover of Cee Lo Green's Forget You, a song called Rollercoaster, and an original acoustic song called Rokstar performed by the group, as well as their song Perfume, which has been confirmed as their second single.

Their first T.V. performance of Louder was on the National Lottery. Their second major T.V. performance was at the launch of the Nintendo 3DS alongside other performers including Russell Kane and Plan B.

The group debuted the track while there were supporting a number of celebrities including Alexandra Burke, Shakira, Ellie Goulding and Shayne Ward

Track listing
iTunes EP track list:
  
"Louder" (2:53)
"Louder" (Wideboys Cut Up remix edit) (3:24)
"Louder" (Wideboys Remix) (6:54)
"Louder" (Steve Smart & Westfunk remix) (5:24)

Charts

Release history

References

2010 songs
2011 debut singles
Parade (band) songs
Songs written by Alan Sampson
Songs written by Kuk Harrell
Asylum Records singles